The Cloud Room is the first album by the Cloud Room, released in 2005. Stuart Mason of AllMusic called the opening track and lead single, "Hey Now Now", "one of the great alt-pop singles of the first half of 2005.". The song was also used in advertising for the carbonated drink Pepsi.

Track listing 
 All tracks are composed by the Cloud Room.
 "Hey Now Now"
 "Waterfall"
 "Blackout!"
 "Devoured in Peace"
 "Sunlight Song"
 "Beautiful Mess"
 "The Hunger"
 "Oh My Love"
 "Blue Jean"
 "Sunlight Reprise"
 "We Sleep in the Ocean"

References

External links

2005 debut albums
The Cloud Room albums